Ardarroch is a small hamlet, located in what is commonly known as the Kishorn area,  on the north east shore of Loch Kishorn,  within the Strathcarron, Ross-shire, Scotland, and is in the Scottish council area of Highland.

References

See also
Loch Kishorn

Populated places in Ross and Cromarty